Toni Impekoven (21 June 1881 – 6 May 1947) was a German actor and writer. Impekoven was a popular playwright, who co-authored the hit comedy The Scoundrel with Hans Reimann. The play was turned into films on two occasions. He was the brother of Sabine Impekoven and the husband of Frieda Impekoven, with whom he had a daughter Niddy Impekoven.

Selected filmography 
 The Scoundrel (1931)
 The Court Concert (1936)
 The Scoundrel (1939)
 The Court Concert (1948)

References

Bibliography

External links 
 

1881 births
1947 deaths
German male actors
Actors from Cologne
German male writers